Dr. Abdel Moneim Aboul Fotouh Abdel Hady (or ) (born 15 October 1951) is an Egyptian physician, former student activist and a politician. In 2011–2012, he ran for President of Egypt as an independent. He was formerly a leader of the Muslim Brotherhood.

He is known for his staunch opposition to the Sadat and Mubarak regimes as well as his openness towards people of different political ideologies, a subject of controversy among some supporters of Egyptian Islamist movements. Affiliated with the Muslim Brotherhood since the early 1970s, Abou al-Fotouh had been a member of the Brotherhood's Guidance Bureau from 1987 until 2009. In 2011, he formally quit all political work with the Muslim Brotherhood and resigned from its membership, following his decision to run for president in the presidential election in 2012. He is currently the secretary-general of the Arab Medical Union. He was arrested on 14 February 2018.

Early life
Abou al-Fotouh was born in the old Cairo district to a family which was originally from the Gharbia Governorate. He graduated from Cairo University's School of Medicine with honors in 1975 and received a bachelor's degree in law from the same university. He went on to attain a master's degree in hospital management from the Helwan University's Faculty of Commerce.

During his time at university, Abou al-Fotouh was the president of the student union at the College of Medicine at Qasr Aini in 1973 and then became the president of the student union of Cairo University in 1975, as well as the secretary of the Media Committee for all Egyptian Universities. While president of the student union at Cairo University, Abou al-Fotouh famously debated with Anwar Sadat. Abou al-Fotouh called Sadat's close followers a bunch of hypocrites, citing Sadat's restriction on Sheikh Mohammed al-Ghazali's speeches and the arrests of student demonstrators on campus. Sadat was angered and ordered Aboul Fotouh to stop in the middle of the debate, demanding that Aboul Fotouh should show respect for him.

Political career

Al-Gama'a al-Islamiyya
Fotouh helped found al-Gama'a al-Islamiyya in the 1970s. When he was criticized by Amr Moussa in the 2012 presidential debate for belonging to the organization, he responded by saying that it was a "peaceful movement" at the time.

Muslim Brotherhood
Fotouh was a prominent student leader in the 1970s and coordinated with other students, including Essam Al Eryan and Ibrahim El Zafarany, to facilitate the entry of the many small Islamic organizations into the Muslim Brotherhood. For many years, he was a member of the Muslim Brotherhood and served on its Guidance Bureau. He was called "one of the Brotherhood's most respected members" but he quit its Guidance Bureau in 2009 then quit the Muslim Brotherhood in 2011.

Debate with President Sadat
When he was the head of Cairo University's student union, Abou al-Fotouh had a discussion with President Anwar Sadat. He accused Sadat and those who were working with him of being 'brown-nosers' because they banned Mohammed al-Ghazali from speaking in public.

Imprisonment
Abou al-Fotouh was arrested in 1981 in the famous September arrests that targeted members of Islamic groups in large numbers. He was then tried in a military court for the members of the Muslim Brotherhood. He was imprisoned for five years, from 1996 to 2001. He had been working as the aide to the secretary-general of the Arab Medical Union before his imprisonment, and after his release, he became secretary-general of the same organization. He was sentenced for 15 years as of March 29th 2022 due to his criticsm of the current Egyptian government.

Presidential campaign
In 2011, after the Egyptian Revolution, Abou al-Fotouh announced that he would be running for the Presidency of Egypt. That was welcomed among some political forces, but it was met with dissent among the Muslim Brotherhood; as the organization had previously stated that they would not be putting forth a candidate for the coming presidential election, the decision "hardened the resentment of the Brotherhood's youth who saw Fotouh as their mentor." In late December 2011, Mohamed Morsy, president of the Freedom and Justice Party, stated that "the party will not endorse any presidential candidate that left the MB even if he was once a leading member in the organization or even if his ideals are similar to those of the MB." He was, of course, making an indirect reference to Abou al-Fotouh. He then reiterated that "the FJP will not introduce a presidential candidate, but is rather seeking one to support."

Aboul Fotouh has attempted to build a broad base of support. Fotouh was officially endorsed by the Salafi Al-Nour Party on 28 April 2012.

He initiated the Strong Egypt Party after losing the 2012 presidential election.

Positions
Known for liberal Islamist views, as a leader within the Muslim Brotherhood, and a stress of social justice, Abou al-Fotouh claims to have worked to ensure that the ideas of the Muslim Brotherhood conformed with democratic principles. He declared on the BBC that the source of true power and legislation was not in a law or constitution but in the people.

References

1951 births
Cairo University alumni
Candidates for President of Egypt
Egyptian dissidents
Muslim Brotherhood leaders
Egyptian Sunni Muslims
Egyptian prisoners and detainees
Living people
Politicians from Cairo
Prisoners and detainees of Egypt
Helwan University alumni
20th-century Egyptian politicians
21st-century Egyptian politicians
Political prisoners in Egypt